The 2021–22 BYU Cougars men's basketball team represented Brigham Young University in the 2021–22 NCAA Division I men's basketball season. It was head coach Mark Pope's third season as BYU's head coach and the Cougars eleventh season as members of the West Coast Conference (WCC). The Cougars played their home games at the Marriott Center in Provo, Utah. They finished the season 24-11, 9-6 in WCC Play to finish in 5th place. They defeated Loyola Marymount in the Second Round of the WCC tournament before losing in the Third Round to San Francisco. They received an at-large bid to the National Invitation Tournament where they defeated Long Beach State and Northern Iowa to advance to the quarterfinals where they lost to Washington State.

Previous season 

The Cougars finished the 2020–21 season 20–7, 10–3 in West Coast Conference play to finish in second place. As the Number 2 seed in the WCC Tournament, they lost to Gonzaga in the finals. BYU received an at-large bid to the NCAA tournament as a Number 6 seed. UCLA defeated BYU in the first round of the tournament 73–62.

Offseason

Departures 
Matt Haarms and Brandon Averette waived their additional season of eligibility due to coronavirus and joined professional teams in Europe. Wyatt Lowell, Kolby Lee and Connor Harding all transferred to other Utah colleges and universities. Due to injuries, Jesse Wade graduated early and decided to forgo additional years of college eligibility and end his college basketball career. In mid-July, media reports indicated that Brandon Warr had decided to leave the team to focus on school and that Cameron Pearson had decided to transfer from BYU.

Incoming transfers 
Two players joined the roster after entering the transfer portal during the offseason. Te'Jon Lucas was recruited by Utah, Nevada, DePaul and New Mexico State but committed to BYU on May 19. He is a redshirt senior and has one year of eligibility due to COVID-19 eligibility extension. On July 19, Seneca Knight announced he had committed to BYU after two full seasons at San Jose State and transferring to LSU mid-season. He is a junior and was also considering transferring to Georgia Southern and Idaho. On September 24, Knight received a waiver from the NCAA is will be eligible to play for the 2021–22 season.

Returned missionaries 
Four returned missionaries were added to the roster for the 2021–22 season. Nate Hansen and Trey Stewart will hold scholarship positions while Casey Brown and Jeremy DowDell will join as preferred walk-ons. Each of the four players have four years of eligibility remaining.

Currently serving missionaries 
Six players committed to BYU are completing missionary service during the 2021–22 season. Four of these players - Dallin Hall, Tanner Hayhurst, Richie Saunders and Tanner Toolson will complete their service during the season and will join the roster for the 2022–23 season. Townsend Tripple delayed his missionary assignment to Argentina and was part of the roster during the 2020–21 season. Jake Wahlin was part of the 2021 recruiting class and plans to complete a mission trip and join the team for the 2023–24 season.

2021 Recruiting class 
Jake Wahlin committed to BYU in early September and officially signed on November 11, 2020. Wahlin was recruited by Arizona State, San Diego State and New Mexico as well as other schools. He plans to complete a mission trip and join the team for the 2023–24 season. In addition, forward Fousseyni Traore from Wasatch Academy signed with the Cougars on November 19, over schools such as Seton Hall and Utah State. He will join the program for the 2021–22 season. Atiki Ally Atiki, from the London Basketball Academy in Ontario, Canada, verbally committed to BYU on February 15, 2021, and will also join the program for the 2021–22 season. On August 8, 2021, Paora Winitana, from American Heritage School in Utah, committed to BYU as a walk-on. He plans to complete a mission after one year on the team.

2022 Recruiting class 
Collin Chandler committed and signed with BYU on November 10, 2021. Chandler was recruited by Utah, Arizona, Stanford, and Utah State. He will go on a mission and enroll at BYU in 2024. He is the highest ranked BYU recruit since Eric Mika in 2013. Adam Stewart committed to BYU after being recruited since 7th grade. He will be a walk-on starting with the 2024–25 season after completing a mission to Paris, France. Braeden Moore committed to BYU after he had originally committed in 2021 to play at Rutgers. He was recruited by Kansas, Wisconsin, Nebraska, Arizona State, Houston, San Diego State, and Auburn.

Roster

Media coverage

Radio 
Greg Wrubell and Mark Durrant return to call men's basketball for the 2021–22 season. Jason Shepherd will act as the host for most games, though Ben Bagley will fill-in for Shepherd when he has women's soccer, baseball, or college basketball duties. Terry Nashif will fill-in for Durrant on a select number of games. Jarom Jordan filled-in for Wrubell Nov. 20 against Central Methodist when Wrubell had football duties, and Shepherd filled-in against Missouri State (Dec. 4) and Weber State (Dec. 18) when Greg had College Cup and Independence Bowl duties. Tyson Jex filled in for Durrant against Creighton (Dec. 11) after weather conditions prevented Durrant from making it to South Dakota. 

 Affiliates:

 BYU Radio- Flagship Station Nationwide (Dish Network 980, Sirius XM 143, KBYU 89.1 FM HD 2, TuneIn radio, and byuradio.org)
 KSL 102.7 FM and 1160 AM- (Salt Lake City / Provo, Utah and ksl.com)
 KSNA 100.7 FM - Blackfoot / Idaho Falls / Pocatello / Rexburg, Idaho (games)
 KSPZ 105.1 FM and 980 AM- Blackfoot / Idaho Falls / Pocatello / Rexburg, Idaho (coaches' shows)
 KMXD 100.5 FM- Monroe / Manti, Utah
 KSVC 980 AM- Richfield / Manti, Utah
 KDXU 94.9 FM and 890 AM- St. George, Utah

Television 
In September 2019, the West Coast Conference (WCC) agreed to a multi-year deal through the 2026–27 season with ESPN and the CBS Sports Network to broadcast numerous basketball games each year. Previously, the WCC had an agreement with ESPN, but the new agreement adds additional television coverage of basketball games through the CBS Sports Network. Games broadcast on the CBS Sports Network are carried on channel 158 on the Dish Network, channel 221 on DirecTV and channel 269 on Xfinity. Under the terms of the deal, ESPN will broadcast 17 games during the regular season and the CBS Sports Network will broadcast a minimum of 9 games. ESPN will continue to broadcast the quarterfinals, semifinals and the championship game of the WCC tournament. BYU maintains the rights to broadcast home games on BYUtv (11.1 in Salt Lake City, Utah, channel 374 on the Dish Network, and channel 4369/9403 on DirecTV). Meanwhile, Stadium broadcasts will be simulcast on KJZZ or KMYU. The broadcasts became even more important after Sinclair sold KSTU, causing Stadium to leave the Digital 3 station.

Schedule and results 

|-
!colspan=12 style=| Exhibition

|-
!colspan=12 style=| Non-Conference Regular Season

|-
!colspan=12 style=|  WCC Regular Season

|-
!colspan=12 style=| WCC Tournament

|-
!colspan=12 style=| NIT

Game summaries
Series Histories are adjusted for the second consecutive season. On the series history the 47 wins the NCAA had BYU forfeit during the 2015–16 and 2016–17 seasons aren't indicated. The forfeits are not added to the loss column. They are merely struck from the win column. All rankings are from the AP poll unless specifically indicated otherwise.

Blue/White Scrimmage

Broadcasters: Dave McCann, Blaine Fowler, & Spencer Linton 
Starting Lineups:
BYU White: Hunter Erickson, Spencer Johnson, Seneca Knight, Caleb Lohner, Gavin Baxter
BYU Blue: Trey Stewart, Te'Jon Lucas, Gideon George, Trevin Knell, Richard Harward

Exhibition: Colorado Christian

Broadcasters: Dave McCann, Blaine Fowler, & Spencer Linton 
Starting Lineups:
Colorado Christian: DJ McDonald, Isaiah Alanzo, Andy Stafford, Nic Zeil, Ross Williams
BYU: Te'Jon Lucas, Gideon George, Alex Barcello, Caleb Lohner, Richard Harward

Cleveland State

Series History: First Meeting Broadcasters: Dave McCann, Blaine Fowler, & Spencer Linton Starting Lineups:
Cleveland State: Craig Beaudion, Tre Gomillion, Torrey Patton, Deante Johnson, D'Moi Hodge
BYU: Te'Jon Lucas, Gideon George, Alex Barcello, Caleb Lohner, Gavin Baxter

San Diego State 

Series History: BYU leads 49–26

Broadcasters: Dave McCann, Blaine Fowler, & Spencer Linton 
Starting Lineups:
San Diego State: Keshad Johnson, Adam Seiko, Matt Bradley, Trey Pulliam, Nathan Mensah
BYU: Te'Jon Lucas, Gideon George, Alex Barcello, Caleb Lohner, Gavin Baxter

Oregon

Series History: Oregon leads 14–9 
Broadcasters: Roxy Bernstein & Sean Farnham 
Starting Lineups:
BYU: Te'Jon Lucas, Gideon George, Alex Barcello, Caleb Lohner, Gavin Baxter
Oregon: Quincy Guerrier, Eric Williams Jr, Devion Harmon, Will Richardson, Jacob Young

Central Methodist

Series History: First Meeting

Broadcasters: Dave McCann & Blaine Fowler 
Starting Lineups:
Central Methodist: Tim Cameron, Isaiah May, Jonathan Brown, Fode Camara, Thomas Sowoolu
BYU: Te'Jon Lucas, Gideon George, Alex Barcello, Caleb Lohner, Gavin Baxter

Texas Southern

Series History: BYU leads 3–0 
Broadcasters: Dave McCann, Blaine Fowler & Spencer Linton 
Starting Lineups:

Texas Southern: Yahuza Rasas, PJ Henry, Bryson Etienne, Justin Hopkins, Brison Gresham
BYU: Te'Jon Lucas, Gideon George, Alex Barcello, Caleb Lohner, Gavin Baxter

Utah

Series History: BYU leads 132–129

Broadcasters: Roxy Bernstein & Don MacLean 
Starting Lineups:
BYU: Te'Jon Lucas, Gideon George, Alex Barcello, Caleb Lohner, Gavin Baxter
Utah: David Jenkins Jr., Both Gach, Riley Battin, Rollie Worster, Branden Carlson

Utah Valley

Series History: BYU leads 4–1 
Broadcasters: Dave McCann, Blaine Fowler, & Spencer Linton 
Starting Lineups:
BYU: Te'Jon Lucas, Alex Barcello, Seneca Knight, Caleb Lohner, Gavin Baxter
Utah Valley: Le'Tre Darthard, Blaze Nield, Connor Harding, Tim Fuller, Fardaws Aimaq

Missouri State

Series History: Series even 1–1

Broadcasters: John Sadak & Tim Doyle 
Starting Lineups:
BYU: Te'Jon Lucas, Alex Barcello, Trevin Knell, Seneca Knight, Caleb Lohner
Missouri State: Isiaih Mosley, Ja'Monta Black, Donovan Clay, Keaton Hervey, Gaige Prim

Utah State

Series History: BYU leads 143–92 
Broadcasters: Dave McCann, Blaine Fowler, & Spencer Linton 
Starting Lineups:
Utah State: Brandon Horvath, RK Eytle-Rock, Rylan Jones, Brock Miller, Justin Bean
BYU: Te'Jon Lucas, Alex Barcello, Trevin Knell, Seneca Knight, Caleb Lohner

Creighton

Series History: BYU leads 6–3

Broadcasters: Telly Hughes & Shon Morris 
Starting Lineups:
BYU: Te'Jon Lucas, Alex Barcello, Trevin Knell, Seneca Knight, Caleb Lohner
Creighton: Ryan Nembhard, Alex O'Connell, Ryan Kalkbrenner, Arthur Kaluma, Ryan Hawkins

Weber State

Series History: BYU leads 33–11 
Broadcasters: Dave Fox, Lance Allred, & Tim LaComb 
Starting Lineups:
BYU: Te'Jon Lucas, Atiki Ally Atiki, Alex Barcello, Trevin Knell, Caleb Lohner
Weber State: Dillon Jones, Seikou Sisoho Jawara, Koby McEwen, Alex Tew, JJ Overton

South Florida

Series History: BYU leads 1–0

Broadcasters: Roxy Bernstein & Corey Williams 
Starting Lineups:
BYU: Te'Jon Lucas, Atiki Ally Atiki, Alex Barcello, Trevin Knell, Caleb Lohner
South Florida: Javon Greene, Bayron Matos, Sam Hines Jr., Caleb Murphy, Jamie Chaplin

Vanderbilt

Series History: Vanderbilt leads 1–0 
Broadcasters: Roxy Bernstein & Corey Williams 
Starting Lineups:
BYU: Te'Jon Lucas, Atiki Ally Atiki, Alex Barcello, Trevin Knell, Caleb Lohner
Vanderbilt: Scotty Pippen Jr., Rodney Chatman, Jordan Wright, Myles Stute, Quentin Millora-Brown

Liberty

Series History: BYU leads 6–3

Broadcasters: Roxy Bernstein & Corey Williams 
Starting Lineups:
Liberty: Darius McGhee, Keegan McDowell, Kyle Rode, Joseph Venzant, Shiloh Robinson
BYU: Te'Jon Lucas, Alex Barcello, Trevin Knell, Caleb Lohner, Fousseyni Traore

Westminster

Series History: BYU leads 1–0 
Broadcasters: Dave McCann, Kristen Kozlowski & Spencer Linton 
Starting Lineups:
Westminster: Matt Kitzman, Donaval Avila, Reme Torbert, Brayden Johnson, Lewis Johnson 
BYU: Te'Jon Lucas, Alex Barcello, Trevin Knell, Caleb Lohner, Fousseyni Traore

Pacific

Series History: BYU leads 12–6 
Broadcasters: Dave McCann, Blaine Fowler & Spencer Linton 
Starting Lineups:
Pacific: Khaleb Wilson-Rouse, Pierre Crockrell II, Alphonso Anderson, Sam Freeman, Luke Avdalovic
BYU: Te'Jon Lucas, Alex Barcello, Trevin Knell, Caleb Lohner, Fousseyni Traore

Saint Mary's

Series History: Series even 16–16 
Broadcasters: Eric Rothman & Sean Farnham 
Starting Lineups:
Saint Mary's: Logan Johnson, Augustas Marciulionis, Matthias Tass, Kyle Bowen, Alex Ducas
BYU: Te'Jon Lucas, Alex Barcello, Trevin Knell, Caleb Lohner, Fousseyni Traore

Gonzaga

Series History: Gonzaga leads 21–5 
Broadcasters: Dave Flemming & Jay Bilas 
Starting Lineups:
BYU: Te'Jon Lucas, Alex Barcello, Trevin Knell, Caleb Lohner, Fousseyni Traore
Gonzaga: Julian Strawther, Drew Timme, Andrew Nembhard, Chet Holmgren, Rasir Bolton

San Francisco

Series History: BYU leads 21–9
Broadcasters: Chris Lewis & Steve Lappas
Starting Lineups:
BYU: Te'Jon Lucas, Alex Barcello, Trevin Knell, Caleb Lohner, Fousseyni Traore
San Francisco: Khalil Shabazz, Jamaree Bouyea, Patrick Tape, Gabe Stefanini, Yauhen Massalski

San Diego

Series History: BYU leads 15–6 
Broadcasters:  Dave McCann, Blaine Fowler, & Spencer Linton 
Starting Lineups:
San Diego:Joey Calcaterra, Wayne McKinney III, Josh Parrish, Marcellus Earlington, Terrell Brown
BYU: Te'Jon Lucas, Alex Barcello, Trevin Knell, Caleb Lohner, Fousseyni Traore

Portland

Series History: BYU leads 21–2
Broadcasters: Dave McCann, Blaine Fowler, & Spencer Linton
Starting Lineups:
Portland: Moses Wood, Tyler Robertson, Chris Austin, Chika Nduka, Mike Meadows
BYU: Te'Jon Lucas, Alex Barcello, Trevin Knell, Caleb Lohner, Fousseyni Traore

Santa Clara

Series History: BYU leads 28–6 
Broadcasters:  Dave Flemming & Sean Farnham 
Starting Lineups:
BYU: Te'Jon Lucas, Alex Barcello, Trevin Knell, Caleb Lohner, Fousseyni Traore
Santa Clara: PJ Pipes, Josip Vrankic, Keshawn Justice, Parker Braun, Jalen Williams

Pacific

Series History: BYU leads 13–6 
Broadcasters: Eric Rothman & Richie Schueler 
Starting Lineups:
BYU: Te'Jon Lucas, Alex Barcello, Trevin Knell, Caleb Lohner, Fousseyni Traore
Pacific: Khaleb Wilson-Rouse, Pierre Crockrell II, Alphonso Anderson, Sam Freeman, Luke Avdalovic

San Francisco

Series History: BYU leads 22–9
Broadcasters: John Sadak & Bob Wenzel
Starting Lineups:
San Francisco: Khalil Shabazz, Jamaree Bouyea, Patrick Tape, Gabe Stefanini, Yauhen Massalski
BYU: Te'Jon Lucas, Gideon George, Alex Barcello, Trevin Knell, Fousseyni Traore

Gonzaga

Series History: Gonzaga leads 22–5 
Broadcasters: Dave Flemming, Sean Farnham, & Molly McGrath
Starting Lineups:
Gonzaga: Julian Strawther, Drew Timme, Andrew Nembhard, Chet Holmgren, Rasir Bolton
BYU: Gideon George, Alex Barcello, Trevin Knell, Seneca Knight, Fousseyni Traore

Loyola Marymount

Series History: BYU leads 14–4
Broadcasters: Dave Flemming & Sean Farnham
Starting Lineups:
BYU: Te'Jon Lucas, Gideon George, Alex Barcello, Seneca Knight, Fousseyni Traore
Loyola Marymount: Eli Scott, Joe Quintana, Cam Shelton, Alex Merkviladze, Keli Leaupepe

Pepperdine

Series History: BYU leads 16–10 
Broadcasters: Rich Waltz & Steve Wolf
Starting Lineups:
BYU: Gideon George, Alex Barcello, Trevin Knell, Seneca Knight, Caleb Lohner
Pepperdine: Houston Mallette, Mike Mitchell Jr., Carson Basham, Maxwell Lewis, Jan Zidek

Saint Mary's

Series History: BYU leads 17–16 
Broadcasters: Dave Flemming & Sean Farnham 
Starting Lineups:
BYU: Te'Jon Lucas, Gideon George, Alex Barcello, Seneca Knight, Fousseyni Traore
Saint Mary's: Logan Johnson, Matthias Tass, Tommy Kuhse, Kyle Bowen, Alex Ducas

Loyola Marymount

Series History: BYU leads 15–4
Broadcasters: John Sadak, Chris Walker, & John Hollinger
Starting Lineups:
Loyola Marymount: Eli Scott, Joe Quintana, Jalin Anderson, Cam Shelton, Alex Merkviladze
BYU: Te'Jon Lucas, Gideon George, Alex Barcello, Caleb Lohner, Fousseyni Traore

Pepperdine

Series History: BYU leads 17–10 
Broadcasters: Eric Rothman & Dane Bradshaw
Starting Lineups:
Pepperdine: Houston Mallette, Mike Mitchell Jr., Carson Basham, Victor Ohia Obioha, Jay Yoon
BYU: Te'Jon Lucas, Gideon George, Alex Barcello, Caleb Lohner, Fousseyni Traore

WCC 2nd Round: Loyola Marymount

Series History: BYU leads 16–4
Broadcasters: Dave McCann & Blaine Fowler
Starting Lineups:
Loyola Marymount: Eli Scott, Joe Quintana, Lamaj Lewis, Cam Shelton, Alex Merkviladze
BYU: Te'Jon Lucas, Gideon George, Alex Barcello, Caleb Lohner, Fousseyni Traore

WCC 3rd Round: San Francisco

Series History: BYU leads 22–10 
Broadcasters: Dave  Flemming & Sean Farnham
Starting Lineups:
BYU: Te'Jon Lucas, Gideon George, Alex Barcello, Caleb Lohner, Fousseyni Traore
San Francisco: Khalil Shabazz, Jamaree Bouyea, Patrick Tape, Gabe Stefanini, Yauhen Massalski

NIT 1st Round: Long Beach State

Series History: BYU leads 6–5
Broadcasters: Roxy Bernstein & Corey Williams
Starting Lineups:
Long Beach State: Jordan Roberts, Drew Cobb, Joel Murray, Jadon Jones, Colin Slater 
BYU: Te'Jon Lucas, Gideon George, Alex Barcello, Caleb Lohner, Fousseyni Traore

NIT 2nd Round: Northern Iowa

Series History: BYU leads 1–0 
Broadcasters: Roxy Bernstein & Corey Williams
Starting Lineups:
UNI: Nate Heise, Tywhon Pickford, AJ Green, Trae Berhow, Noah Carter
BYU: Te'Jon Lucas, Gideon George, Alex Barcello, Caleb Lohner, Fousseyni Traore

NIT Quarterfinal: Washington State

Series History: Series even 5–5
Broadcasters: Dave Feldman & Perry Clark
Starting Lineups:
Washington State: Efe Abogidi, Tyrell Roberts, TJ Bamba, Michael Flowers, Mouhamed Flowers
BYU: Te'Jon Lucas, Gideon George, Alex Barcello, Caleb Lohner, Fousseyni Traore

Rankings 

^The Coaches poll did not release a week 1 ranking.

Future opponents 
For the upcoming 2022–23 season, BYU is scheduled to play the following non-conference opponents:

 Utah (home)
 Utah Valley (home)
 Battle 4 Atlantis - field consists of Kansas, Tennessee, USC, North Carolina State, Wisconsin, Butler and Dayton (neutral site in The Bahamas)
 Iona (site TBD)
 Weber State - in-state likely opponent
 Utah State - in-state likely opponent
Creighton (home/neutral)
Missouri State (home)

See also 
For additional BYU sports info,

References 

BYU Cougars men's basketball seasons
Byu
BYU Cougars men's basketball
BYU